Naples Airport , formerly known as Naples Municipal Airport, is a public use airport located two nautical miles (4 km) northeast of the central business district of Naples, the most populous city and county seat of Collier County, Florida. It is owned by the Naples Airport Authority. The airport is home to flight schools, air charter operators, car rental agencies, and corporate aviation and non-aviation businesses. The airport is also a central location for public services, including fire/rescue services, mosquito control, the Collier County Sheriff's Aviation Unit and other community services.

During fiscal year 2017–2018, the airport serviced more than 112,000 operations. The airport currently has no scheduled commercial service, and is used almost exclusively for general aviation.

History
The facility was established in 1942 as Naples Army Airfield by the United States Army Air Forces. It was initially assigned to the Southeast Training Center (later Eastern Flying Training Command), and provided basic (level 1) flight training to flight cadets by Embry-Riddle Co; Fairchild PT-19s were the primary trainers used. Along with the flight training, it was a sub-base to Buckingham Army Airfield for flexible gunnery training, which the 75th Flying Training Wing supervised. It was inactivated as a military airfield in November 1945 and turned over to the War Assets Administration for conveyance to civil control as a public airport.

The Naples Airdrome was returned to the city of Naples and Collier County in 1947, after the military deemed it no longer necessary. The airport was managed by John Zate, a pilot and Naples resident. Provincetown-Boston Airlines began scheduled service to Miami International Airport in the 1950s, and managed the airport for several years until a municipal airport authority was created in 1969. The airport also historically had scheduled service to Orlando, Tampa, St. Pete–Clearwater, Miami and Key West under PBA in the late 1970s. Traffic at the airport peaked in 1980, when more than 195,000 passengers used the airport, but fell in the mid-1980s due to the opening of the much larger Southwest Florida International Airport in nearby Fort Myers. The airport code APF derives from "alternate Page Field" - which is a reference to Page Field in Fort Myers.

The airport experienced a rebound in traffic during the mid-1990s, with 173,000 passengers and seven airlines in 1995. Passenger numbers dipped when American Eagle ceased scheduled service to Miami in 2001, and dipped even further following the September 11, 2001, attacks. In 2003, US Airways Express ceased its service from Naples to Tampa. Atlantic Southeast Airlines operated Delta Connection flights between Naples and Atlanta from 2004 to 2007 with a revenue guarantee from the city, but ended the service after retiring its fleet of 40-seat aircraft, again leaving the airport without scheduled service. Yellow Air Taxi had flights to Fort Lauderdale and Key West, but the service was ended in December 2008. Elite Airways also began scheduled service to the airport in February 2016, with flights to Portland (ME), Newark, Vero Beach, and Melbourne (FL), but ended in March 2017 due to low passenger counts.

In December 2018, the airport authority changed the facility's name from Naples Municipal Airport to Naples Airport. They also changed the airport's logo to a more modern one.

Facilities and aircraft 
It also has one turf runway designated SW/NE which measures .

For the 12-month period ending September 30, 2017, the airport had 95,018 aircraft operations, an average of 260 per day: % general aviation, % air taxi, % military and % airline. At that time, there were 304 aircraft based at this airport: % single-engine, % multi-engine, % jet and % helicopter.

The airport has two terminals: one for passengers, and the other for general aviation. Charter airlines like ExecAir, baggage claim, boarding gates, security, and car rental agencies are located in the passenger terminal. There is also a military museum with WWII artifacts and memorabilia. The car rental agencies offered are Hertz, Avis, Enterprise, Thrifty and Alamo. The General Aviation Terminal is a two-story terminal used for personal flights, and also houses car rental agencies.

General aviation
 FBOs:
 Naples Jet Center
 Naples Aviation
 Aircraft charter and management:
 Elite Jets
 Velox Air Charter
 Clay Lacy Aviation
 Monarch Air Group
 Naples Jet Center
 Salt Island Seaplanes

Accidents and incidents
 On September 10, 1985, a Douglas DC-3 of Collier County Mosquito Control District crashed at East Naples while on approach to Naples Municipal Airport following an engine failure. The aircraft was on agricultural duties at the time. The two people on board the aircraft survived the accident.
 On June 20, 2005, a Cessna 182 Skylane departing Naples Municipal Airport entered an area of severe weather over the Gulf of Mexico. The aircraft was never recovered, with the crash resulting in one fatality.

References

Other sources

 
 Manning, Thomas A. (2005), History of Air Education and Training Command, 1942–2002. Office of History and Research, Headquarters, AETC, Randolph AFB, Texas 
 Shaw, Frederick J. (2004), Locating Air Force Base Sites, History’s Legacy, Air Force History and Museums Program, United States Air Force, Washington DC.

External links
 Naples Airport, official site
 Aerial image as of February 1999 from USGS The National Map
 
 
 

1943 establishments in Florida
Airports in Florida
Transportation buildings and structures in Collier County, Florida
Airports established in 1943
Airfields of the United States Army Air Forces in Florida
USAAF Contract Flying School Airfields